Udankhedi is a village within the Rajgarh District in central Madhya Pradesh, India. Located in Sarangpur Mandal of Rajgarh District in Madhya Pradesh State. Udankhedi is  far from its Mandal town of Sarangpur. Udankhedi is located  distance from its district headquarters at Rajgarh.

Transportation
Udyan Kheri railway station is the main railway station of the locality situated on Indore–Gwalior line under the Bhopal railway division of West Central Railway zone.

References

Rajgarh, Madhya Pradesh
Villages in Rajgarh district